Connaught Engineering, often referred to simply as Connaught, was a Formula One, Formula Two and sports car constructor from the United Kingdom. Their cars participated in 18 Grands Prix, entering a total of 52 races with their A, B, and C Type Formula 2 and Formula 1 Grand Prix Cars. They achieved 1 podium and scored 17 championship points. The name Connaught is a pun on Continental Autos, the garage in Send, Surrey, which specialised in sales and repair of European sports cars such as Bugatti, and where the cars were built.

History
In 1950, the first single-seaters, the Formula 2 "A" types, used an engine that was developed by Connaught from the Lea-Francis engine used in their "L" type sports cars. The engine was extensively re-engineered and therefore is truly a Connaught engine. The cars were of conventional construction for the time with drive through a preselector gearbox to a de Dion rear axle. In 1952 and 1953, the Grand Prix races counting towards the World Championship were to Formula 2 rules so drivers of these cars could take part in those events as the table below shows.

Connaught designed a new car for the 2½ litre Formula 1 of 1954 which was to have a rear-mounted Coventry Climax V8 engine (the "Godiva"), but when the engine was not proceeded with, a conventionally arranged "B" type was designed using an Alta engine developed into 2½ litre form. The first cars were built with all-enveloping aerodynamic bodywork but later rebodied conventionally (as the photos below show). In 1955, driving a Connaught in this form, Tony Brooks scored the first win in a Grand Prix by a British driver in a British car since 1923, in a non World Championship race at Syracuse. Thereafter the "B" type has been known as the "Syracuse" Connaught and the name was used for the car presented in the 2004 revival

In 1962, Jack Fairman attempted to qualify for the Indianapolis 500 in a Connaught race car, but failed to find the necessary speed to make the field.

Sports cars
Prior to the single-seat racing cars they built a small number of road going sports cars developed on the Lea-Francis Sports Chassis, which achieved considerable competition success. These were of types L2 and L3, and three examples of the stark Cycle Winged L3/SR Sports Racer. Two sports cars, based on the A Type Formula 2 cars, the ALSRs were also built for competition work.

In 2004, the Connaught name was revived by Connaught Motor Company for their Type D Syracuse and Type D-H hybrid sports cars.

Complete Drivers' World Championship results
(key)

*Constructors points not awarded until 
± = Indicates a shared drive

See also
 List of car manufacturers of the United Kingdom

References

External links 

Connaught Motor Company

Connaught
Formula One entrants
Sports car manufacturers
1952 establishments in England
1959 disestablishments in England
British auto racing teams
British racecar constructors
Auto racing teams established in 1952
Auto racing teams disestablished in 1959
24 Hours of Le Mans teams